The Murder of Mary Phagan is a 1988 American two-part television miniseries starring Jack Lemmon about the murder of a 13-year-old factory worker and the subsequent trial of her accused murderer Leo Frank. The supporting cast features Richard Jordan, Robert Prosky, Peter Gallagher, Kathryn Walker, Rebecca Miller, Paul Dooley, Charles Dutton, Kevin Spacey, Cynthia Nixon, Dylan Baker and William H. Macy.

Summary
Dramatizing the true story of Leo Frank, a factory manager who was convicted of the murder a 13-year-old girl, a factory worker named Mary Phagan, in Atlanta in 1913. His trial was sensational and controversial, and at its end, Frank was convicted of murdering Mary Phagan and sentenced to death by hanging.  After Frank's legal appeals failed, the governor of Georgia commuted his death sentence to life imprisonment on June 21, 1915, destroying his own career in the process. On the morning of August 17, 1915 Frank was kidnapped from prison and lynched by a small group of prominent men from Marietta, Georgia, Mary Phagan's home town.

Production
Written by Larry McMurtry, produced by George Stevens Jr., and directed by William "Billy" Hale, the miniseries stars Lemmon and features Kevin Spacey, Rebecca Miller, Peter Gallagher, Charles Dutton, Richard Jordan, Cynthia Nixon, Dylan Baker and William H. Macy. Lemmon noted during a publicity appearance on The Tonight Show Starring Johnny Carson shortly before the miniseries was broadcast, that the cast was the best with which he had ever worked.

William H. Macy, at the beginning of his career, was referred to on the set as "Bill Macy" and billed as "W.H. Macy".

The working title for the picture was The Ballad of Mary Phagan. The film was shot in Richmond, Virginia, extensively in Shockoe Bottom, with a running time of 251 minutes (over 4 hours), originally broadcast over two evenings by NBC. A sharply abbreviated version also exists online, cutting the running time to the standard length of a theatrical film.

Cast
 Jack Lemmon as Gov. John Slaton
 Richard Jordan as Hugh Dorsey
 Robert Prosky as Tom Watson
 Peter Gallagher as Leo Frank
 Kathryn Walker as Sally Slaton
 Rebecca Miller as Lucille Frank
 Paul Dooley as William Burns
 Charles Dutton as Jim Conley
 Kevin Spacey as Wes Brent
 Cynthia Nixon as Doreen
 Dylan Baker as the Governor's Assistant
 William H. Macy as Randy (credited as W.H. Macy)
 Kevin Kravitz as Jurist (unbilled)
 William Newman
 Russell Murray as Militia Guard  (unbilled)

Honors
The film won three Emmy Awards including Outstanding Miniseries and a Peabody Award.

Other treatments
An earlier movie version of the case, with the names changed, was directed by Mervyn LeRoy in 1937 and titled They Won't Forget, starring Claude Rains and Lana Turner. In 1997, David Mamet published a book about Leo Frank titled The Old Religion.  The following year a Broadway musical titled Parade, written by the playwright Alfred Uhry, with music composed by Jason Robert Brown was produced. In 2004 the journalist Steve Oney published his history of the Mary Phagan case, titled And the Dead Shall Rise. The trial and Frank's lynching have also been explored in works of academic history.

References

External links
 

1988 television films
1988 films
1980s crime drama films
American biographical series
American crime drama films
Films about Jews and Judaism
Films about miscarriage of justice
Films set in Atlanta
Films set in the 1910s
NBC network original films
Peabody Award-winning television programs
Primetime Emmy Award for Outstanding Miniseries winners
Films with screenplays by Larry McMurtry
Crime films based on actual events
Films set in 1913
Films set in 1915
Films directed by William Hale (director)
1980s American films